Perry Park can refer to:

Perry Park, Kentucky, USA
Perry Park, Colorado, USA
Perry Park (Iowa), a baseball grounds
Perry Park, Brisbane, Australia
Perry Park (Birmingham), England